Jordan FA Shield 2009 was the 28th Jordan FA Shield.

The 12 teams of Jordan League 2009-10 were divided into two groups, the teams playing against each other once. The two group winners advanced to the final.

In the final, held on 1 August 2009, Al-Faisaly beaten Al Arabi Irbid 4–0.

Group 1

Group 2

3rd place match

Final

References

Jordan Shield Cup
Shield